New York Palace may refer to:

Lotte New York Palace Hotel, New York City
Palace Theatre (New York City)
New York Palace Hotel, Budapest

See also
 Palace Theatre (Albany, New York)
 Palace Theatre (Syracuse, New York)